Pattan is the capital of Lower Kohistan District in the Khyber Pakhtunkhwa province of Pakistan.

Climate
With a mild and generally warm and temperate climate, Pattan features a humid subtropical climate (Cfa) under the Köppen climate classification. The average temperature in Pattan is 19.6 °C, while the annual precipitation averages 802 mm. Even in the driest months, there is a lot of precipitation. November is the driest month with 17 mm of precipitation, while July, the wettest month, has an average precipitation of 123 mm.

July is the hottest month of the year with an average temperature of 29.3 °C. The coldest month January has an average temperature of 7.9 °C.

See also 

 Dasu
 Khyber Pakhtunkhwa

References

External links
Khyber-Pakhtunkhwa Government website section on Lower Dir
United Nations
 PBS paiman.jsi.com

Populated places in Lower Kohistan District
Union councils of Khyber Pakhtunkhwa
Union Councils of Kohistan District, Pakistan
Tehsils of Khyber Pakhtunkhwa